Xscape is an American girl group from Atlanta, Georgia, formed in 1991 by Kandi Burruss, Tameka "Tiny" Cottle, LaTocha Scott, Tamera Coggins-Wynn, and Tamika Scott. The following year Coggins-Wynn left the group and Xscape became a quartet. They were discovered by Jermaine Dupri who signed the group to his So So Def label. The group released their debut album Hummin' Comin' at 'Cha in 1993, which spawned two of their biggest hits "Just Kickin' It" and "Understanding". The album was certified Platinum on February 1, 1994. Xscape has sold more than 9 million records worldwide.

The group went on to release their second album, Off the Hook in 1995 and was certified Platinum on November 16, 1995. The lead single "Feels So Good" and "Who Can I Run To" were both certified Gold in the United States. Their third and final album Traces of My Lipstick was released in 1998. The lead single "The Arms of the One Who Loves You" was certified Gold on May 14, 1998, and the album was certified Platinum on June 21, 1999, in the United States. The group disbanded in 1998 to pursue solo projects and reformed in 2017.

On February 11, 2018, it was announced that Kandi Burruss had taken a hiatus due to being on Broadway and wouldn't be featured on new music. This caused the group to temporarily downsize and rebrand to XSCAP3 (featuring Tameka "Tiny" Harris, sisters Tamika Scott and LaTocha Scott).

XSCAP3 released singles "Wifed Up" and "Dream Killa", which spawned their release of their first EP as a trio Here for It released March 2, 2018. It was also announced that they fired their manager, Vincent Herbert.

Career

Hummin' Comin' at 'Cha (1992–1994)
After Tamera Coggins left the group in 1993, Xscape became a quartet. They were later discovered by Jermaine Dupri, who immediately signed the group to his So So Def label and debuted the quartet at his birthday party in 1992. The group released their debut album, Hummin' Comin' at 'Cha, on October 12, 1993, which peaked at number seventeen the U.S. Billboard 200 and number three on the Top R&B Albums chart. It was critically and commercially successful, being certified platinum within a year, and launched two top 10 singles. The debut single, "Just Kickin' It", and second single, "Understanding", both entered the top 10 of the official Hot 100 and became platinum and gold-certified number-one hits, respectively, on the Hot R&B/Hip-Hop Songs chart. The follow-up singles, "Love on My Mind" and "Tonight", did not achieve the same success.

After promotion for Hummin' Comin' at 'Cha concluded, the group contributed to The Mask soundtrack with the song "Who's That Man?", and also appeared on "Freedom (Theme from Panther)" from the soundtrack to the 1995 film Panther, which the group along with TLC, SWV, En Vogue, Jade and others.

Off the Hook (1995–1997)

Xscape released their second studio album, Off the Hook, in 1995. The lead single, "Feels So Good", reached #32 of the US Hot 100, while "Who Can I Run To" peaked at #8. The follow-up singles, "Do You Want To" and "Can't Hang", the latter featuring rapper MC Lyte, were released as a double A-side single. It went only as high as number 50 on the Hot 100 but peaked at #9 on the "Hot R&B/Hip Hop" charts. The album eventually went platinum.

In 1996, the group was featured on a number of singles, including singing background vocals on a remix version of Mariah Carey's 11th Billboard Hot 100 chart-topper "Always Be My Baby". The remix, formally known as the "Mr. Dupri Mix", also featured a rap verse by their So So Def label mate, Da Brat. The group also appeared on MC Lyte's single "Keep On Keepin' On", which appeared on the Sunset Park soundtrack. The single reached number 10 on the Hot 100, becoming MC Lyte's best single on the pop charts and #3 on the Hot R&B/Hip-Hop Songs charts.  In 1997, the group's songs appeared on the soundtracks to the films Love Jones and Soul Food.

Traces of My Lipstick and hiatus (1998–2002)

In early 1998, Xscape was featured on the Keith Sweat produced single, a cover of Atlantic Starr's "Am I Dreamin'", by R&B newcomer group Ol' Skool. The single was a success in North America, peaking at #31 on the "Hot 100", and was later featured on Xscape's third album Traces of My Lipstick.

Traces of My Lipstick debuted at #28 on the Billboard 200 and at #6 on the Hot R&B/Hip Hop album chart; over a million copies were sold in the U.S. The album featured the top 10 hit "The Arms of the One Who Loves You", which reached #7 on the Hot 100 chart, and "My Little Secret", which reached #9. Although their unofficial third single was released, "Softest Place on Earth" reached #28 on the Hot R&B/Hip-Hop Songs chart.

After Traces of My Lipstick, LaTocha Scott initially left the group to pursue a solo career. She later joined her sister Tameka Scott and Tameka Cottle to reform the group. The three members requested Burruss also rejoin.  When Burruss declined, she was asked to sign a "leaving member notice", signing over her rights to the Xscape name. She signed and the remaining three original members went on to make appearances on the Big Momma's House and Hardball soundtracks, before going on another hiatus until 2005.

Failed comeback (2005–2006) 
After a five-year hiatus, sisters LaTocha Scott and Tamika Scott reunited with Tameka "Tiny" Cottle and new member Kiesha Miles to record a fourth album, Unchained. The new single, "What's Up", was released on a mixtape and later got some airplay in hometown Atlanta. However, the album was not released due to lack of promotion from the record label.

Reunion (2017–present) 
On June 25, 2017, the original four group members had their first performance together in over 18 years at the 2017 BET Awards. They would also perform at the Essence Festival and at Chene Park in Detroit.

In September 2017, the group announced a reunion tour featuring 29 cities from late November through early January 2018, and were to be joined by Monica and Tamar Braxton. On September 22 of the same year, the group made their first appearance together on daytime television on The Wendy Williams Show, performing "My Little Secret" and "Understanding". On November 12, Kandi publicly announced that she would not be making new music with Xscape at this time. Two new singles titled "Wifed Up" and "Dream Killa" were released on December 1, neither single featuring Burruss.

In late 2017, Kandi Burruss indicated in numerous interviews her lack of interest in recording new music as Xscape, stating that she was pursuing Broadway roles instead. Because of this, Tiny, LaTocha and Tamika formed the subunit XSCAP3, which included three of the five original Xscape members, with the notable exception of Burruss. As a trio, XSCAP3 signed with Creative Artists Agency (CAA) in January 2018 for representation in all areas. The trio also formally created a recording label, XSCAP3 Entertainment. In late 2017 to early 2018, the members of XSCAP3 recorded six original songs that were later included in their subunit's debut EP.

On March 2, 2018, "XSCAP3" released their EP titled "Here for It" on all digital outlets.

On May 8, 2021, Verzuz presented a pre-Mother's day battle featuring both Xscape and another popular 1990s female R&B group, SWV. Both DJs, AONE and Spinderella, were responsible for music play for both groups.

In 2022, the group will be awarded the Lady Of Soul at the 2022 Soul Train Awards.

Members

Kandi Burruss

Kandi Burruss (born May 17, 1976) is a lower lyric soprano , singing the lower harmonies. She was also known for her head voice, as sung in "Understanding" and "My Little Secret". Burruss also sang lead parts on other Xscape singles, such as "Just Kickin' It", "Feels So Good",Can't Hang" & Tonight.

After leaving Xscape, she co-wrote songs for artists such as Mariah Carey, Faith Evans, Pink, Whitney Houston, and Alicia Keys. She has also written songs for the groups TLC, Destiny's Child, RichGirl, 'N Sync, and Boyz II Men.  She is also responsible for discovering the male R&B quartet Jagged Edge. In 1999, she appeared on Solé's debut album, and was in a video for the single "4, 5, 6". Also that year, Burruss teamed with groupmate Tameka "Tiny" Cottle to score the international number one hit "No Scrubs" for TLC. and "Bills, Bills, Bills" for Destiny's Child. Kandi would go on to work with Pink by co-writing her debut single "There You Go".  In 2000, Columbia Records released her solo debut, Hey Kandi, which featured the hit song "Don't Think I'm Not". In 2003, Burruss sang backup on "Wide Open" for LSG's final album LSG2. In 2006 she released "I Need", featuring Eightball & MJG from an unreleased solo album on UpFront Records. She is also featured on E-40's hit "U and Dat" under the name Kandi Girl. In 2007, she formed a duo, Peach Candy, with Atlanta female rapper Rasheeda.

Burruss has been a cast member of the hit Bravo reality show The Real Housewives of Atlanta since the show's second season. During her first season on the show she recorded material for her latest album Kandi Koated, featuring tracks "Fly Above" and "Leave U". The album was released in December 2010. She currently produces the adult sex-toy line Bedroom Kandi, owns a restaurant called Old Lady Gang, owns a clothing company in honor of her son Ace (Raising Ace) as well as TAGS Boutique, a cosmetics line called "Kandi Koated Cosmetics", the non-profit organization Kandi Cares, and finally Kandi Koated Entertainment.

Tameka "Tiny" Cottle

Tameka "Tiny" Harris (born July 14, 1975) is a lyric soprano in the group, usually singing the melody on their songs, but sometimes taking the top note as well (as in "Tonight").  She sang lead parts on the Xscape singles "Understanding", "Tonight", "Do You Want To", "My Little Secret", and the single "Am I Dreamin'", an Atlantic Starr remake by Ol' Skool with Keith Sweat.
Cottle is well known for co-writing TLC's 1999 hit No Scrubs with Burruss, singing vocals on the song's chorus.  She also sang the chorus of Lil' Kim's "I Know You See Me", Bow Wow's "Let's Get Down", and on 8Ball & MJG's "Things We Used to Do".

Cottle starred in the BET reality show Tiny & Toya, which followed Cottle and her friendship with Antonia "Toya" Carter, the ex-wife of rap artist Lil’ Wayne. In 2011, she and her husband T.I. began appearing in the reality series T.I. and Tiny: The Family Hustle, and appeared in its spin-off Tiny and Shekinah's Weave Trip, in October 2014.

LaTocha Scott

LaTocha Scott (born October 2, 1973) is a lyric soprano in the group, usually singing soprano in the harmonies (as seen in several live performances), but sometimes singing mezzo-soprano (as in the backgrounds of "Tonight" and other songs) and sometimes even singing contralto when Kandi is leading (as in "Feels So Good").  She sang lead parts on most Xscape songs, and is considered the lead singer in the group due to this and being the eldest group member.  After Xscape's first disbanding, heart released a solo album titled Solo Flight 404 featuring "One Night Stand", her duet with artist J-Shin. She also contributed the song "Liar, Liar" to the soundtrack of The Best Man, and was a featured artist on Cha Cha's "Dear Diary" and Trick Daddy's single "Thug Holiday", and released the single "Bad Timing" in 2012.
Scott was cast in the second season of TVOne's R&B Divas: Atlanta along with Faith Evans, Syleena Johnson, Nicci Gilbert, Monifah, Angie Stone, and Keke Wyatt, though she was not a part of the third season, nor was there any mention of her previous involvement.

Tamika Scott

Tamika Scott (born November 19, 1975) is a lyric soprano in the group, typically singing the melody between Burruss and her sister LaTocha in the harmony. She's most known for her lead vocals on "Understanding", "Love on My Mind", "Who Can I Run To", and "The Arms of the One Who Loves You". After Xscape's breakup, Scott released a song titled "Day and Night" with Giant Swing, and played the role of Milay Brown in Tyler Perry’s hit Meet the Browns. She wrote and produced four songs for Tyler Perry’s movie soundtrack Daddy's Little Girls.  On the soundtrack, she performed a song titled "Greatest Gift". Scott also wrote and performed the title song from Tyler Perry's Why Did I Get Married. She is set to appear in the upcoming film Conundrum: Secrets Among Friends.

Discography

 Hummin' Comin' at 'Cha (1993) 
 Off the Hook (1995)
 Traces of My Lipstick (1998)

References

External links
Official Kandi Website
Official Tiny Website
Official Tamika website

Xscape performing on Teen Summit

American contemporary R&B musical groups
Grammy Award winners
Musical groups established in 1990
Musical groups from Atlanta
Rappers from Atlanta
African-American girl groups
Musical groups disestablished in 2001
Musical groups reestablished in 2005
Musical groups disestablished in 2009
Musical groups reestablished in 2017